Agdistis is a deity of Greek, Roman and Anatolian mythology who possesses both male and female reproductive organs. They were closely associated with the Phrygian goddess Cybele.

Agdistis’ androgyny was seen as a symbol of wild and uncontrollable nature, which the other gods saw as a threat, leading to their destruction.

Mythology
There are at least two origin stories for Agdistis. According to Pausanias, Zeus unknowingly fathered Agdistis, a superhuman being who was both man and woman, with Gaia. In other versions, there was a rock called Agdo, which Gaia slept upon. Zeus impregnated Gaia there and she later gave birth to Agdistis.

The gods were afraid of the androgynous Agdistis. Depending on the telling, one god, Dionysus or Liber, put a sleeping draught in Agdistis' drinking well. After Agdistis had fallen asleep, Dionysus tied their foot to their penis with a rope. When Agdistis awoke and stood up, they ripped their penis off, castrating themself. The blood from this incident fell to the earth and an almond tree grew from where it landed. Arnobius mentions that purple violets sprang from the blood instead.

Nana, daughter of a river-god Sangarius, was gathering fruit from this tree and stored some in her bosom, where they disappeared and made her pregnant with Attis. After giving birth to Attis, Nana abandoned him and human foster parents took the infant in.

As an adult, Attis was of such extraordinary beauty that the now conventionally female Agdistis fell in love with him, despite being his blood father. However, his foster parents intended him to become the husband of the daughter of the king of Pessinus, and he accordingly went to the Pessinian royal court.

When the marriage song commenced, Agdistis appeared in full glory, and all the wedding guests were instantly driven mad, causing both Attis and the king of Pessinus to castrate themselves and the bride to cut off her breasts. Agdistis then repented her deed and obtained from Zeus the promise that the body of Attis would not decompose.

This is the most prevalent account of an otherwise mysterious affair, and the interpretation of this myth is often debated, particularly how it relates to ancient gender changes and sexuality. Some tellers add geographic details: Pausanias mentions a hill in Phrygia named "Agdistis", at the foot of which Attis was reportedly buried.

Cult of Agdistis
The distinction between Agdistis and the Phrygian great mother goddess Cybele  is unclear:
 According to Hesychius and Strabo, Agdistis is the same as Cybele, who was worshiped at Pessinus under that name.
 However, in many ancient inscriptions, Agdistis is distinct from Cybele, whereas, in many others, they are listed as merely an epithet of Cybele.

Although primarily an Anatolian deity, the cult of Agdistis covered a wide geographical area from Egypt to Crimea. 

Their cult was found in the mid-Aegean islands and the mainland Greek city of Piraeus as early as the 3rd-4th century BC. From there, it spread to Attica and Rhamnous, where a sanctuary to Agdistis was built. It reached Egypt by 250 BC. Inscriptions honoring them have been found on Crete at Paros and in the mainland and coastal Anatolia. Evidence of the cult has been found in Sardis, where inscriptions found as early as the 4th century BC indicate that priests of Zeus were not permitted to take part in the mysteries of Agdistis, and inscriptions honoring the deity at Mithymna. In the 1st century BC, their shrine in Philadelphia, Anatolia, required a strict code of behavior. At that location – and others – they are found with sister deities ("").

Additionally, Agdistis' cult was found in far-off Panticapeum, on the eastern shore of Crimea, and at the Greek island of Lesbos, after 80 BC.

There is epigraphic evidence that in some places Agdistis was considered a healing deity of a wholly benevolent nature.

In an attempt to understand the contradictory representations and syncretism of the Anatolian mother goddesses, scholars have hypothesized that Agdistis is part of a continuum of androgynous Anatolian deities, including an ancient Phrygian deity probably named Andistis and one called Adamma, stretching back to the ancient kingdom of Kizzuwatna in the 2nd millennium BC.

See also
 Aphroditus, the androgynous aspect of the goddess Aphrodite
 Galli, the eunuch priests of the goddess Cybele in Rome, and her consort Attis
 Hermaphroditus, the androgynous son of Hermes and Aphrodite

References

External links

 

 

 

  — information about Greece and Cyprus

Androgynous and hermaphroditic deities
Roman deities
Phrygian goddesses
Cybele
LGBT themes in Greek mythology
Intersex in religion and mythology
Children of Zeus
Metamorphoses into trees in Greek mythology
Metamorphoses into flowers in Greek mythology